Clapmatch Point is a low, lava point penetrated by narrow clefts, forming the southwest point of Candlemas Island, South Sandwich Islands. The name applied by the UK Antarctic Place-Names Committee in 1971 is a traditional sealers name for a female Fur seal. There is a breeding colony of this animal on the point.

Carbon Point is located just northwest of Clapmatch Point.

References
 

Headlands of South Georgia and the South Sandwich Islands